Thomas Lawrence (1689–1754) was a merchant who was elected to six one-year terms as mayor of Philadelphia between 1727 and his death in 1754. He was also a founder and trustee of The Academy and College of Philadelphia.

Formative years
Born in New York City, Lawrence moved to Philadelphia in 1720, where, for the rest of his life, he was engaged in the mercantile business. In 1730, after being associated with James Logan, Lawrence formed a partnership with Edward Shippen; Shippen & Lawrence became one of Philadelphia's leading firms.

Political career
Apart from his life in private business, Lawrence held several positions of trust in the city, including serving as mayor for six one-year terms, as city councilman and alderman, and as judge of the county court. During 1730 he worked with Dr. John Kearsley and Andrew Hamilton on a committee for the preparation and planning to build the Philadelphia state house, the later Independence Hall. At the provincial level, Lawrence began his service on the Provincial Council in 1728.

Death and interment
Lawrence died in Philadelphia in 1754, while still an office holder, and was buried at Philadelphia's Christ Church Burial Ground.

Following his death, a notice was placed in Benjamin Franklin's Pennsylvania Gazette which lauded Lawrence's record of public service and his humanity in all aspects of his life.

Legacy
Lawrence was a founder and trustee of The Academy and College of Philadelphia.

References

External links
Brief biography and portrait at the University of Pennsylvania

1689 births
1754 deaths
Mayors of Philadelphia
Members of the Pennsylvania Provincial Council
Politicians from New York City
University of Pennsylvania people
People of colonial Pennsylvania
People of the Province of New York
University and college founders
Colonial American merchants
Burials at Christ Church, Philadelphia